Apocalypse Child is a 2015 Philippine independent film directed by Mario Cornejo, set in the Philippine coastal town of Baler and featuring aspects of local surf culture. It stars Sid Lucero, Annicka Dolonius, Gwen Zamora, RK Bagatsing, Ana Abad Santos, and Archie Alemania, and was co-written by Mario Cornejo and Monster Jimenez.

Production

Development
Apocalypse Child initially had a different title and a different story, still written by Mario Cornejo and Monster Jimenez. The film's original plot revolved around four middle-aged women who went on to learn about surfing because they fell in love with a young surf instructor.

But they changed the plot as soon as they went to Baler, Aurora to do further research and learn more about the history of surfing in the Philippines. Surf culture in the country, according to an a legend, began because of a Hollywood film. Apocalypse Now shot some of its scenes in Baler in the 1970s and allegedly, the crew left a surfboard floating in the sea. The surfboard was later used by five local boys who taught themselves how to surf and became the first Philippine surfing champions.

Cornejo and Jimenez played around with this myth and incorporated it in their film. What if the Apocalypse Now production team left behind some children as well? This was how the Ford's character came to be, who was led to believe his whole life that he was the son of Apocalypse Now director Francis Ford Coppola. While writing the script, they already had Sid Lucero in mind to play the part. They also explored archetypes such as the favorite daughter, sacrificing mother, the "worst fault", and the father's son.

The final script was submitted to the QCinema Film Festival after which they secured partial funding.

Principal photography
The film was shot in Baler, Aurora within 20 days with production firm, Filmex helping Cornejo and Jimenez in scheduling the principal photography. The production staff had a four-day break.

Release
Apocalypse Child had its premiere at the QCinema Film Festival in October 2015, about seven months after the script was submitted to the organizers. The film was later screened in film festivals in Italy, New York City and Pittsburgh in the United States, and South Korea. It had its commercial release in Philippine cinemas on October 26, 2016.

Reception

References

External links
 
 

2015 films
Films directed by Mario Cornejo
Films by Monster Jimenez
Philippine independent films
Philippine New Wave
Films set in Aurora (province)
Films shot in Aurora (province)